Lau Fau Shan is an area of Yuen Long District, in the New Territories of Hong Kong. It is at the shore of Deep Bay, near Tin Shui Wai and facing Shekou in Shenzhen, China.

Economy
Lau Fau Shan is traditionally famous for fresh oysters. About 100 tons were harvested every year, some for consumption in Hong Kong restaurants and some for export to neighboring countries. However, little remains of this today since most of the inhabitants of Lau Fau Shan have given up oyster culture.

Features
Here stands a 1500-year-old temple founded by the legendary monk Pui To, who is said to have landed on this coast in a wooden tub.

Climate

Education
Lau Fau Shan is in Primary One Admission (POA) School Net 72. Within the school net are multiple aided schools (operated independently but funded with government money) and one government school: Tin Shui Wai Government Primary School (天水圍官立小學).

See also
 Metapenaeus ensis
 Former Lau Fau Shan Police Station
 Ngau Hom
 San Hing Tsuen

References